Hedras David Ramos Velasquez (colloquially: Hedras Ramos) (born February 3, 1992 in Guatemala City, Guatemala) is a Guatemalan multi-instrumentalist, specializing in guitar. Throughout his career he has opened for popular bands such as Kansas, Whitecross, Die Toten Hosen, and was chosen by Axl Rose to open for Guns N' Roses on their "Chinese Democracy" show in Guatemala.

Biography

Music career
Hedras began his musical career at age 6 by learning to play the drums. It wasn't until 2005 however (at age 13) when Hedras became interested in learning guitar. He typically practiced 7 or more hours every day, even playing up to 12 hours a day during vacations from school.

Entirely self-taught, Hedras pushed himself hard to master the guitar and on December 15, 2009, by the time he was 16 years old, he had composed and produced his first instrumental album New Sounds. Following this release was his instrumental Christmas album The Holy Gift of Shred which became available for purchase in November 2009.

Between writing and producing albums, Hedras began to play and compete in guitar contests from different areas of the globe. On June 16, 2009, he won second place at the Guitar Idol competition (a worldwide event held in London, UK in which undiscovered guitarists compete online for a chance to play at the London International Music Show). On September 18, 2010 Hedras won second place at another worldwide event held in Bucharest, Romania called the Ziua Chitarelor.

In 2011 he released his third instrumental album Atoms And Space, which featured solos and guest performances by artists like Jennifer Batten (former guitarist for Michael Jackson), Andy James (guitarist), Billy Ashbaugh (former drummer for Greg Howe, 'N Sync, Justin Timberlake, Britney Spears and Pat Benatar), Muris Varajic (keyboard) and Sergey Boykov (keyboard).

In 2011, after guitarist Richie Faulkner left the project to join Judas Priest, Hedras agreed to take on all guitar work for Sir Christopher Lee's heavy metal album Charlemagne: The Omens of Death (2013).

In 2016 Hedras played with guitarist Paul Gilbert in Guatemala city. Through his career Hedras has performed with many recognized guitar heroes including Kiko Loureiro, Michael Lee Firkins and many more.

In 2017 Hedras released his latest album "The Impressionist", where he incorporated 8 string guitar to his fusion style of Progressive Metal with Jazz and Classical Influences.

After moving to Los Angeles CA, In 2018 Hedras started giving many guitar clinics at prestigious Music School "Musicians Institute" which led to his participation at the Big Mama Jamathon where he performed with guitar legend Steve Vai.

Endorsements

On February 13, 2011, Rock Band released a new game featuring Ramos and the single "Insanity of the Atoms" from his third album Atoms and Space. On September 2 of that same year, Rock Band released another game featuring the single "Stellar Crash", also from Atoms and Space. Both games are currently available for Xbox 360 users and are not yet rated.

Ramos endorses a number of other products including Halo Guitars' Hedras Ramos Signature Guitar which was designed specifically as a signature product for him. At age 17, Ramos became an endorser of Dean Markley guitar strings and later Multisonus Audio. During the year 2012, Ramos became one of three Latin-American guitarists to be fully endorsed by Xotic (a company that produces guitars, basses and effects pedals).

Currently Hedras is an active collaborator and creative designer for Cort Guitars, they successfully had launched several lines of models based out of the X series Cort Model, such as Duality X700 and Mutility X700, being the most recent the current Duality II equipped with Fishman Fluence Classic Pickups.

Discography

Atoms And Space (2011)
Charlemagne: The Omens of Death (2013)
The Impressionist (2017)
Pagans (2020)
Angels (2022)

References

1992 births
Guatemalan guitarists
Living people
Multi-instrumentalists
Rock guitarists
21st-century guitarists